Egon Adler (18 February 1937 – 28 January 2015) was a German cyclist. He won the silver medal in the team time trial event at the 1960 Summer Olympics

References

1937 births
2015 deaths
People from Leipzig (district)
German male cyclists
German track cyclists
Cyclists from Saxony
Olympic cyclists of the United Team of Germany
Cyclists at the 1960 Summer Olympics
Olympic silver medalists for the United Team of Germany
Olympic medalists in cycling
Medalists at the 1960 Summer Olympics
Recipients of the Patriotic Order of Merit in bronze